The 1852 United States presidential election in Louisiana took place on November 2, 1852, as part of the 1852 United States presidential election. Voters chose six representatives, or electors to the Electoral College, who voted for President and Vice President.

Louisiana voted for the Democratic candidate, Franklin Pierce, over Whig candidate Winfield Scott. Pierce won Louisiana by a narrow margin of 3.88%.

Results

See also
 United States presidential elections in Louisiana

References

Louisiana
1852
1852 Louisiana elections